The Mechanized Brigade "Isonzo" was a short-lived brigade of the Italian Army created during the 1975 army reform and renamed Mechanized Brigade "Mantova" during the 1986 army reform. The name of the brigade was chosen to commemorate the twelve Battles of the Isonzo during World War I.

Activation 

In 1975 the Italian Army undertook a major reorganization of its forces: the regimental level was abolished and battalions came under direct command of multi-arms brigades. As tensions with Yugoslavia over the city if Trieste were allayed by the Treaty of Osimo and because of a reduction of military service from 15 to 12 months for army and air force and from 24 to 18 months for the navy, forced the army to reduce its forces by nearly 45,000 troops, it was decided that the units of the Infantry Division "Mantova" would contract to a single brigade. Therefore, most units of the Mantova were disbanded and on 21 October 1975 the remaining units of the division were used to raise the Mechanized Brigade "Isonzo" in Cividale del Friuli. The brigade's command was created by reorganizing and renaming the command of the 76th Infantry Regiment "Napoli" in Cividale del Friuli. After the activation the "Isonzo" brigade entered the Mechanized Division "Mantova" and consisted of the following units.

  Mechanized Brigade "Isonzo", in Cividale del Friuli
 Command and Signal Unit "Isonzo", in Cividale del Friuli
  63rd Tank Battalion "M.O. Fioritto", in Cordenons (Leopard 1A2 main battle tanks)
  52nd Infantry Fortification Battalion "Alpi", in Attimis (former I Battalion, 52nd Infantry Regiment "Alpi", fielded 12x companies)
  59th Mechanized Infantry Battalion "Calabria", in Cividale del Friuli (former II Battalion, 59th Infantry Regiment "Calabria")
  76th Mechanized Infantry Battalion "Napoli", in Cividale del Friuli (former I Battalion, 76th Infantry Regiment "Napoli")
  114th Mechanized Infantry Battalion "Moriago", in Tricesimo (former II Battalion, 114th Infantry Regiment "Mantova")
  120th Infantry Fortification Battalion "Fornovo", in Ipplis (former III Battalion, 52nd Infantry Regiment "Alpi", fielded 13x companies)
  28th Field Artillery Group "Livorno", in Tricesimo (M114 155mm towed howitzers) (former IV Heavy Field Artillery Group, 5th Field Artillery Regiment)
  Logistic Battalion "Isonzo", in Tricesimo
 Anti-tank Company "Isonzo", in Tarcento (BGM-71 TOW anti-tank guided missiles)
 Engineer Company "Isonzo", in Tarcento

The brigade was tasked with defending the central part of the Yugoslav-Italian border against a possible Warsaw Pact invasion with the Alpine Brigade "Julia" on its left flank and the Mechanized Brigade "Gorizia" on its right flank.

Deactivation 
During 1986 the Italian Army abolished the divisional level and brigades, that until then had been under one of the Army's four divisions, came forthwith under direct command of the Army's 3rd or 5th Army Corps. As the Mechanized Division "Mantova" carried a historically significant name, the division ceased to exist on 1 October 1986 in Udine, but the next day in the same location the Mechanized Brigade "Mantova" was activated. The new brigade took command of the units of the Mechanized Brigade "Isonzo", whose name was stricken from the roll of active units of the Italian Army.

References 

Mechanized brigades of Italy
Military units and formations established in 1975
Military units and formations disestablished in 1986